The 1997 Western Illinois Leathernecks football team represented Western Illinois University as a member of the Gateway Football Conference during the 1997 NCAA Division I-AA football season. They were led by eighth-year head coach Randy Ball and played their home games at Hanson Field. The Leathernecks finished the season with an 11–2 record overall and a 6–0 record in conference play, making them conference champions. The team received an automatic bid to the NCAA Division I-AA Football Championship playoffs, where they defeated  before losing to McNeese State in the quarterfinals.

Running back Aaron Stecker, a transfer from Wisconsin, finished the year with 1,957 rushing yards and 24 touchdowns, which ranked second and first in Division I-AA respectively. Stecker was named the Gateway Conference's offensive player of the year.

Schedule

References

Western Illinois
Western Illinois Leathernecks football seasons
Missouri Valley Football Conference champion seasons
Western Illinois Leathernecks football